The 1902 Lafayette football team was an American football team that represented Lafayette College as an independent during the 1902 college football season. In its first season and only season under head coach Dave Fultz, the team compiled an 8–3 record. Harry Trout was the team captain. The team played its home games at March Field in Easton, Pennsylvania.

Schedule

References

Lafayette
Lafayette Leopards football seasons
Lafayette football